"Out the Mud" is a song by American rappers Lil Baby and Future, released on June 21, 2019 through Quality Control Music, Wolf Pack Global and Motown. Produced by Quay Global, it peaked at number 70 on the Billboard Hot 100.

Background and composition
The song, which was announced by Lil Baby on an Instagram story a few days before release, has a high-pitched flute loop, "sharp drums and big bass hits" in the instrumental. Lil Baby and Future reflect on their respective backgrounds before fame and rising to success.

Music video
The music video was released on September 9, 2019 and filmed in the neighborhoods that the rappers grew up in Atlanta. As suggestive of the song's title, the clip begins with Lil Baby climbing up a mound of dirt with a crew and kicking around in the mud. He and Future rap in various locations in Atlanta, surrounded by people.

Charts

Certifications

References

2019 singles
2019 songs
Lil Baby songs
Songs written by Lil Baby
Future (rapper) songs
Songs written by Future (rapper)
Motown singles
Songs written by Quay Global
Song recordings produced by Quay Global